The 2019–20 season was Puskás Akadémia FC's 6th competitive season, 3rd consecutive season in the OTP Bank Liga and 8th year in existence as a football club.

Transfers

Summer

In:

Out:

Winter

In:

Out:

Source:

Nemzeti Bajnokság I

League table

Results summary

Results by round

Matches

Hungarian Cup

Statistics

Appearances and goals
Last updated on 27 June 2020.

|-
|colspan="14"|Youth players:

|-
|colspan="14"|Out to loan:

|-
|colspan="14"|Players no longer at the club:

|}

Top scorers
Includes all competitive matches. The list is sorted by shirt number when total goals are equal.
Last updated on 27 June 2020

Disciplinary record
Includes all competitive matches. Players with 1 card or more included only.

Last updated on 27 June 2020

Overall
{|class="wikitable"
|-
|Games played || 40 (33 OTP Bank Liga and 7 Hungarian Cup)
|-
|Games won || 19 (14 OTP Bank Liga and 5 Hungarian Cup)
|-
|Games drawn || 13 (12 OTP Bank Liga and 1 Hungarian Cup)
|-
|Games lost || 8 (7 OTP Bank Liga and 1 Hungarian Cup)
|-
|Goals scored || 82
|-
|Goals conceded || 43
|-
|Goal difference || +39
|-
|Yellow cards || 102
|-
|Red cards || 6
|-
|rowspan="1"|Worst discipline ||  Roland Szolnoki (12 , 2 )
|-
|rowspan="1"|Best result || 15–0 (A) v Maglód - Magyar Kupa - 30-10-2019
|-
|rowspan="1"|Worst result || 1–4 (H) v Fehérvár - Nemzeti Bajnokság I - 07-03-2020
|-
|rowspan="1"|Most appearances ||  Thomas Meißner (37 appearances)
|-
|rowspan="1"|Top scorer ||  Ádám Gyurcsó (15 goals)
|-
|Points || 70/120 (58.33%)
|-

References

External links
 Official Website
 UEFA
 fixtures and results

Puskás Akadémia FC seasons
Hungarian football clubs 2019–20 season